Pattusali (also spelt as Pattu Sale, Pattushali, Pata Sali & Patha Sali) is a Hindu community predominantly residing in the Indian states of Andhra Pradesh, Telangana, Tamil Nadu, Puducherry, Karnataka and Gujarat.

They wear the sacred thread, follow Hinduism and are mainly Vaishnavas, though there is a significant proportion of Shaivas as well. They are Telugu speakers and are found largely in the state of Andhra Pradesh particularly in Anantapur, Godavari, Srikakulam, Visakhapatnam and Vijayanagaram districts.

These people specialise in weaving silk used to decorate and worship gods with silk cloth known as Pattu, hence the name Pattusali in Telugu. Traditionally, Pattusalis as the name suggests are confined to weave only silk and other finer quality of yarn, where as Padmasalis weave only coarse cloths from cotton, they are often confused with Padmasali while there is no direct connection between their origin or cultures.

See also
Pattariyar
Patnūlkarar
Pattegar
Padmasali

References

External links
Pattusali Community Website I
Pattusali Community Website II

Hindu communities
Social groups of Andhra Pradesh
Social groups of Telangana
Social groups of Karnataka
Social groups of Tamil Nadu
Social groups of Puducherry
Social groups of Gujarat
Social groups of India
Telugu society
Weaving communities of South Asia